The 183rd Massachusetts General Court, consisting of the Massachusetts Senate and the Massachusetts House of Representatives, met in 2003 and 2004 during the governorship of Mitt Romney. Robert Travaglini served as president of the Senate. Thomas Finneran and then Salvatore DiMasi each served as speaker of the House.

Notable legislation included "one of the toughest smoking bans in the US, covering workplaces, restaurants, and bars across the state (many of which were already smoke-free as a result of local legislation)."

Senators

Representatives

See also
 108th United States Congress
 List of Massachusetts General Courts

Images

References

Further reading

External links

 
 
 
 
 

Political history of Massachusetts
Massachusetts legislative sessions
massachusetts
2003 in Massachusetts
massachusetts
2004 in Massachusetts